Sharissa Dawes (born August 21, 1975) is an American singer. Born and raised in New York City's borough of Brooklyn, she began her musical career in the girl groups Triple Dose and 4Kast. 4Kast released their 1998 debut album, Any Weather, which was promoted with the singles "Miss My Lovin and "I Tried". After her time in the groups, Sharissa worked as a backing vocalist before she was discovered by Jimmy Henchman.

Her debut solo album, No Half Steppin (2002), peaked at number 44 on the Billboard 200 chart. Several of its songs appeared on other Billboard charts. Sharissa was featured the soundtrack of the 2003 romantic comedy film, Love Actually. Her second solo album, Every Beat of My Heart (2005), was only released in Japan. The singer has also contributed to several compilation albums, and has been featured on other artists' albums.

 Life and career 

 1975–2001: Early life and career 
Sharissa Dawes was born on August 21, 1975 in New York City's borough of Brooklyn. She is the oldest of three children. Raised in the Bronx' Edenwald Projects, she became interested in music at age seven. When Sharissa was about 13, she performed with neighborhood children and sang in her school cafeteria. She was influenced by her mother's music collection (which included Deniece Williams and Patti LaBelle), and recorded and studied televised music specials. Sharissa's father nicknamed her "Little Stevie Wonder". Growing up, she felt pressure within the community: "People expected me to do nothing but have babies and depend on the system. I fought through all that."

Sharissa joined the group Triple Dose as a teenager, and became part of the "urban vocal quartet" 4Kast in 1995. 4Kast released their debut album, Any Weather on October 13, 1998, on RCA Records. Its lead single, "Miss My Lovin'", features Mic Geronimo. Released as the second single on August 21, 1998, "I Tried" reached number 46 on the Hot R&B/Hip-Hop Songs Billboard chart on October 10, 1998. It remained on the chart for 12 weeks. To promote the album, the group performed as part of a fundraiser at Madison Square Garden.

Sharissa contributed "Bring Out The Freak" (featuring ILL Bread) to the 1996 compilation album, The Ultimate Mix. The following year, she released the solo single "Keep It Simple" through Emotive Music. Sharissa became a backing vocalist for a number of singers, including Wyclef Jean, Beanie Sigel, Father MC, and Carl Thomas. Three of her songs appeared on the 2001 compilation album, Bullet Proof Love, Vol. 1: "Money Ain't Gonna Change Us" (including verses from The Prodigy and Bars-N-Hooks), "Gone 2 Long", and "I Can't Wait". Sharissa was also featured on Carl Thomas' "Cold, Cold Wind", on the compilation album BMG Dance Compilation #69, that year.

=== 2002: No Half Steppin''' ===
Jimmy Henchman discovered Sharissa in November 2002. Her 2002 debut album, No Half Steppin', was released through Henchmen and Motown on February 26 of that year. Ayana Byrd of Vibe called its sound a "brand of gritty, hip hop-influenced R&B, and its lyrics revolve around tales of love, heartbreak, and independence"; according to Bryce Wilson, the album was inspired by 1970s music. Jason Birchmeier of AllMusic identified No Half Steppin as part of Motown's attempt "to break new artists into the urban market", and the label was presenting Sharissa in a style similar to Mary J. Blige and Aaliyah. Other music critics also compared the singer to Blige. 

The album received mainly-positive reviews, although some criticized its production.  It peaked at number 44 on the Billboard 200 chart on March 16, 2002 (remaining on the chart for 10 weeks), number seven on the Top R&B/Hip-Hop Albums Billboard chart and number 44 on the Top Album Sales Billboard chart. Sharissa performed material from the album at the Blazin' Hip-Hop and R&B Concert in Pittsburgh on June 16, 2002, and released a mixtape version.

"Any Other Nights music video was "the story of a woman getting her groove back after being neglected by her man". The single peaked at number 72 on the Billboard Hot 100 chart on April 6, 2002, remaining on the chart for 14 weeks. It reached number 21 on the Adult R&B Songs Billboard chart, number 23 on the R&B/Hip-Hop Airplay, number 23 on the Hot R&B/Hip-Hop Songs, and number 70 on the Radio Songs Billboard charts. The album's title track was also released as a single, and was promoted with a video. It peaked at number 75 on the R&B/Hip-Hop Airplay and number 78 on the Hot R&B/Hip-Hop Songs Billboard charts. The third (and final) single from the album was "I Can't Wait".

Sharissa was featured on "You Say Keep It Gangsta" with Butch Cassidy on Wyclef Jean's third studio album, Masquerade, which was released on June 18, 2002. The singer featured on The Ranjahz's "Animal Life", from the album Say What You Say, that year. She also played Yanesha in the 2002 television film, Play'd: A Hip Hop Story. Sociology professor Geoff Harkness wrote in a 2015 article that Yanesha is an example of the bad-girl archetype, which he defined as "sexually insatiable females who emphasize their physical attributes and downplay other aspects of their identity".

 2003–present: Every Beat of My Heart and continued career 
On November 11, 2003, Sharissa contributed "Take Me as I Am" to the soundtrack of the 2003 romantic comedy film Love Actually; it features Wyclef Jean. An accompanying music video was released. The song peaked at number 96 on the Hot R&B/Hip-Hop Songs Billboard chart. Baria A. Razzaq of Vibe criticized the song: "Wyclef Jean misleads her into regurgitating one of his ditties from The Carnival era". Sharissa attended the film's New York City premiere.

EMI Music Japan and Virgin released her second album, Every Beat of My Heart, in Japan on October 25, 2005. The album was originally scheduled for a full release on September 27 of that year. Sharissa has co-writing credits on all its songs, and said about the process: "I can't sing about things that I haven't experienced, so it was important for me to work with producers who understood my struggle." Baria A. Razzaq praised the album for the collaborations with R. Kelly and Millie Jackson.

Singles from the album were "I'm In Love With a Thug", featuring R. Kelly, and "I Got Love". The track "You Can Do Better" reached number 28 on the Adult R&B Songs Billboard chart. Before Every Beat of My Heart, Sharissa had released "Guess Who's Back", "See If I Won't", "You Make It Easy", "I'm Heat" and "Drop on Me" as singles. "I'm Heat" features verses by The Game, and "Drop on Me" includes verses by The Notorious B.I.G.

Sharissa designed a MaDame Bluez & Co. line of "street couture" in 2005 and participated in the reality competition show, Survive This! She performed at a Masonic Temple event in Decatur, Illinois on February 17, 2006, to increase awareness of HIV/AIDS. Sharissa's song, "Further", was included on the compilation album Dear Summer, Vol. 1'' the following year. She released "All or Nuth'n" in 2011 through the Assirahs Music Group.

Discography

Studio albums

Mixtape

As lead artist

As featured artist and other appearances

Other songs

Filmography

Notes

References

Citations

Book sources

External links 

 

1975 births
American contemporary R&B singers
African-American women singer-songwriters
20th-century African-American women singers
Living people
Singer-songwriters from New York (state)
People from the Bronx
21st-century American singers
21st-century American women singers
Motown artists
Virgin Records artists
21st-century African-American women